Marist-Sion College is a co-educational Roman Catholic independent school founded in 1975 and located in Warragul, Victoria, Australia.

Marist-Sion College enrols students from towns spanning from Trafalgar to Nar Nar Goon, Neerim District and Ellinbank District. Marist-Sion College serves four local parishes: Warragul, Drouin, Trafalgar and Iona/Maryknoll.

History
Marist-Sion College was formed in 1975 as a result of a merger between St Joseph's College and Our Lady of Sion College.

St Joseph’s College was a secondary school for boys, which was founded in 1951. Our Lady of Sion College was a secondary school for girls, which was founded in 1905.

Leaders
Lisa Harkin, Principal
Janelle Burgess, Deputy Principal: Pastoral Care
Narelle Hunt, Deputy Principal: Learning
Brett McKellar, Business Manager
Peter Woodhouse, Director of Faith Director
Chris Russell, Director of School Administration
James Mazzolini, Director of Staff Development

House system
Prior to 2001 there were four houses: Champagnat, Joseph, Mackillop and Marcellin. Four new houses were added in 2001: Jericho, Loreto, Lourdes and Sion.
Below are the houses with their respective colours.

Champagnat - navy blue
Joseph - yellow
Jericho - orange
Loreto - white
Lourdes - light blue
MacKillop - green
Marcellin - red
Sion - purple

See also

List of schools in Victoria

References

External links
Official Marist-Sion College Website

Educational institutions established in 1975
Gippsland Independent Schools
Catholic secondary schools in Victoria (Australia)
Association of Marist Schools of Australia
1975 establishments in Australia